The Wrestling Album is the debut soundtrack album released by the World Wrestling Federation (WWF, now WWE) on November 9, 1985, at the height of the Rock 'n' Wrestling Connection era.<ref>{{cite magazine | url = https://www.rollingstone.com/sports/features/the-wrestling-album-at-30-the-inside-story-of-a-record-that-started-a-revolution-20151118 | title= The Wrestling Album' at 30: The Inside Story of an Album that Started a Revolution | author = Montgomery, James | magazine = Rolling Stone | date = 2015-11-18 | accessdate = 2016-01-26}}</ref> It featured mostly theme music of wrestlers on the roster at the time. The Wrestling Album peaked at No. 84 on the album sales charts. None of the singles received any heavy radio airplay nor did they crack the Top 100.

Production
Most of the songs were produced by Rick Derringer. David Wolff, at the time Cyndi Lauper's manager and boyfriend, was executive producer. The album was basically Wolff's concept. Jim Steinman composed and produced "Hulk Hogan's Theme", which was used on the Hulk Hogan's Rock 'n' Wrestling cartoon. Lauper participated on the album as a backing vocalist on "Real American" (which would eventually become Hulk Hogan's entrance theme) and "For Everybody" as well as producer of "Captain" Lou Albano's track under the pseudonym "Mona Flambé."

The album was reissued in 1998 on CD by Koch Records, who licensed the master rights from Epic/Sony. A 30th-anniversary version was released in June 2015 on Sony's Legacy imprint.

The album's tracks are bridged with commentary from Vince McMahon, "Mean Gene" Okerlund, and Jesse "The Body" Ventura. Three singles were issued from the album: "Land of a Thousand Dances" (in a shortened version with overdubbed saxophones), "Grab Them Cakes," and "Don't Go Messin' with a Country Boy." All three singles were issued in picture sleeves, and featured "Captain Lou's History of Music/Captain Lou" as the B-side. "Rowdy" Roddy Piper's track, "For Everybody," was a cover of the Mike Angelo & The Idols song "Fuck Everybody", with all of the profanity removed. A year after the album's release, Jim Steinman wrote lyrics to "Hulk Hogan's Theme" and re-released it as "Ravishing," the opening track of Bonnie Tyler's 1986 album Secret Dreams and Forbidden Fire.

The gatefold cover features the majority of the WWF's 1985 roster posing in a recording studio, with McMahon, Okerlund and Ventura in the foreground and ring announcer Howard Finkel in the center. Lauper can be seen on the back cover wearing a black wig and holding a Rickenbacker guitar.

Track listing
Side one
 The Wrestlers – "Land of a Thousand Dances".
 Junkyard Dog with Vicki Sue Robinson – "Grab Them Cakes" (written by David Wolff, George Pavlis, and Vernie "Butch" Taylor); originally recorded in 1981 by obscure rap artist Captain Chameleon who also recorded "Jive Ol' Fo'" which was covered on Piledriver: The Wrestling Album II'' under the title "Jive Soul Bro"
 Rick Derringer – "Real American" (credited as the group Derringer)
 Jimmy Hart – "Eat Your Heart Out, Rick Springfield"
 "Captain" Lou Albano and George "The Animal" Steele – "Captain Lou's History of Music/Captain Lou"Side two'''
WWF All-Stars – "Hulk Hogan's Theme"
 "Rowdy" Roddy Piper – "For Everybody"
 "Mean" Gene Okerlund – "Tutti Frutti"
 Hillbilly Jim – "Don't Go Messin' with a Country Boy"
 Nikolai Volkoff – "Cara Mia"

See also

Music in professional wrestling

References

External links

WWE albums
Albums produced by Jim Steinman
Albums produced by Rick Derringer
1985 compilation albums
1985 soundtrack albums
Rock compilation albums
E1 Music soundtracks
Epic Records compilation albums
E1 Music compilation albums
Epic Records soundtracks